The following is a list of Supreme Court of Canada opinions written by Beverley McLachlin during her tenure on the Court.

1989
 British Columbia v Henfrey Samson Belair Ltd, [1989] 2 S.C.R. 24
 R v Leaney, [1989] 2 S.C.R. 393
 Falk Bros Industries Ltd v Elance Steel Fabricating Co, [1989] 2 S.C.R. 778
 Scarff v Wilson, [1989] 2 S.C.R. 776
 Watkins v Olafson, [1989] 2 S.C.R. 750
 QNS Paper Co v Chartwell Shipping Ltd, [1989] 2 S.C.R. 683
 R v L (JE), [1989] 2 S.C.R. 510
 R v M (SH), [1989] 2 S.C.R. 446
 Mackeigan v Hickman, [1989] 2 S.C.R. 796
 Oregon Jack Creek Indian Band v Canadian National Railway Co, [1989] 2 S.C.R. 1069
 R v Nygaard, [1989] 2 S.C.R. 1074
 R v Buttar, [1989] 2 S.C.R. 1429

1990
 R v Shubley, [1990] 1 S.C.R. 3
 Rawluk v Rawluk, [1990] 1 S.C.R. 70 (dissent)
 R v Van Rassel, [1990] 1 S.C.R. 225
 R v A, [1990] 1 S.C.R. 995 (dissent)
 R v Wallen, [1990] 1 S.C.R. 827
 CCR Fishing Ltd v British Reserve Insurance Co, [1990] 1 S.C.R. 814
 Nichols v American Home Assurance Co, [1990] 1 S.C.R. 801
 R v B (CR), [1990] 1 S.C.R. 717
 Ratych v Bloomer, [1990] 1 S.C.R. 940
 R v Saunders, [1990] 1 S.C.R. 1020
 R v B (G), [1990] 2 S.C.R. 57
 Rocket v Royal College of Dental Surgeons of Ontario, [1990] 2 S.C.R. 232
 R v Hebert, [1990] 2 S.C.R. 151
 Bishop v Stevens, [1990] 2 S.C.R. 467
 National Trust Co v Mead, [1990] 2 S.C.R. 410
 R v Khan, [1990] 2 S.C.R. 531
 R v Hess; R v Nguyen, [1990] 2 S.C.R. 906
 R v Penno, [1990] 2 S.C.R. 865
 R v Askov, [1990] 2 S.C.R. 1199
 R v Zito, [1990] 2 S.C.R. 1520
 R v Lachance, [1990] 2 S.C.R. 1490
 R v Garofoli, [1990] 2 S.C.R. 1421 (dissent)
 Dersch v Canada (AG), [1990] 2 S.C.R. 1505
 Lester (WW) (1978) Ltd v United Association of Journeymen and Apprentices of the Plumbing and Pipefitting Industry, Local 740, [1990] 3 S.C.R. 644
 R v Scott, [1990] 3 S.C.R. 979 (dissent)
 Canada (Human Rights Commission) v Taylor, [1990] 3 S.C.R. 892 (dissent in part)
 R v Andrews, [1990] 3 S.C.R. 870 (dissent)
 R v Keegstra, [1990] 3 S.C.R. 697 (dissent)
 R v Chaulk, [1990] 3 S.C.R. 1303 (dissent)

1991
 Reference Re Prov Electoral Boundaries (Sask) [1991] 2 S.C.R. 158
 R v Seaboyer [1991] 2 S.C.R. 577
Note: This part of the list is incomplete

1992
Norberg v Wynrib [1992] 2 S.C.R. 224
R v Zundel [1992] 2 S.C.R. 731
Note: This part of the list is incomplete

1993
Hall v Hebert, [1993] 2 S.C.R. 159
R v Creighton, [1993] 3 S.C.R. 3
Rodriguez v British Columbia (AG), [1993] 3 S.C.R. 519
Note: This part of the list is incomplete

1994
Dagenais v Canadian Broadcasting Corp[1994] 3 S.C.R. 835
Note: This part of the list is incomplete

1995
Note: This part of the list is incomplete

1996
Note: This part of the list is incomplete

1997
 R v Leipert, [1997] 1 S.C.R. 281
 R v Stillman, [1997] 1 S.C.R. 607
 R v Curragh Inc, [1997] 1 S.C.R. 537
 R v Noble, [1997] 1 S.C.R. 874
 R v McDonnell, [1997] 1 S.C.R. 948
 Soulos v Korkontzilas, [1997] 2 S.C.R. 217
 Opetchesaht Indian Band v Canada, [1997] 2 S.C.R. 119
 Hickman Motors Ltd v Canada, [1997] 2 S.C.R. 336
 Arndt v Smith, [1997] 2 S.C.R. 539
 R v G (SG), [1997] 2 S.C.R. 716 										
 R v Esau, [1997] 2 S.C.R. 777
 Pasiechnyk v Saskatchewan (Workers' Compensation Board), [1997] 2 S.C.R. 890
 R v S (RD), [1997] 3 S.C.R. 484
 R v Ly, [1997] 3 S.C.R. 698
 Wallace v United Grain Growers Ltd, [1997] 3 S.C.R. 701
 Winnipeg Child and Family Services (Northwest Area) v G (DF), [1997] 3 S.C.R. 925 	
 R v Skalbania, [1997] 3 S.C.R. 995
 Lewis (Guardian ad litem of) v British Columbia, [1997] 3 S.C.R. 1145									
 Delgamuukw v British Columbia, [1997] 3 S.C.R. 1010
 Porto Seguro Companhia De Seguros Gerais v Belcan SA, [1997] 3 S.C.R. 1278
 Bow Valley Husky (Bermuda) Ltd v Saint John Shipbuilding Ltd, [1997] 3 S.C.R. 1210

1998
 Westcoast Energy Inc v Canada (National Energy Board), [1998] 1 S.C.R. 322 (dissent)
 R v Lucas, [1998] 1 S.C.R. 439 										
 R v Charemski, [1998] 1 S.C.R. 679 									
 Canada (Human Rights Commission) v Canadian Liberty Net, [1998] 1 S.C.R. 626
 R v Williams, [1998] 1 S.C.R. 1128
 Canada Safeway Ltd v Retail, Wholesale and Department Store Union, Local 454, [1998] 1 S.C.R. 1079 										
 Battlefords and District Co-operatives Ltd v Retail, Wholesale and Department Store Union, Local 544, [1998] 1 S.C.R. 1118 										
 Union of New Brunswick Indians v New Brunswick (Minister of Finance), [1998] 1 S.C.R. 1161
 R v Cuerrier, [1998] 2 S.C.R. 371 									
 Continental Bank of Canada v Canada, [1998] 2 S.C.R. 358										
 Continental Bank Leasing Corp v Canada, [1998] 2 S.C.R. 298
 R v MacDougall, [1998] 3 S.C.R. 45									
 R v Gallant, [1998] 3 S.C.R. 80

1999

2000

2001

2002

2003

2004

2005

2006

2007
 Little Sisters Book and Art Emporium v Canada (Commissioner of Customs and Revenue), [2007] 1 S.C.R. 38, 2007 SCC 2 (concurrence)
 Resurfice Corp v Hanke, [2007] 1 S.C.R. 333, 2007 SCC 7
 Charkaoui v Canada (Citizenship and Immigration), [2007] 1 S.C.R. 350, 2007 SCC 9
 R v McKay, [2007] 1 S.C.R. 793, 2007 SCC 16
 Strother v 3464920 Canada Inc, [2007] 2 S.C.R. 177, 2007 SCC 24 (dissent)
 Health Services and Support—Facilities Subsector Bargaining Assn v British Columbia, 2007 SCC 27
 Canada (AG) v JTI-Macdonald Corp, [2007] 2 S.C.R. 610, 2007 SCC 30
 Rogers Wireless Inc v Muroff, [2007] 2 S.C.R. 921, 2007 SCC 35 (majority)
 Hill v Hamilton‑Wentworth Regional Police Services Board, [2007] 3 S.C.R. 129, 2007 SCC 41 (majority)
 Jedfro Investments (USA) Ltd v Jacyk, [2007] 3 S.C.R. 679, 2007 SCC 55 (majority)

2008
 R v Beatty, [2008] 1 S.C.R. 49, 2008 SCC 5 (concurrence)
 R v Ferguson, [2008] 1 S.C.R. 96, 2008 SCC 6 (majority)
 R v Turningrobe, [2008] 1 S.C.R. 454, 2008 SCC 17 (majority)
 Mustapha v Culligan of Canada Ltd, [2008] 2 S.C.R. 114, 2008 SCC 27 (majority)
 R v Kapp, [2008] 2 S.C.R. 483, 2008 SCC 41 (majority)
 Holland v Saskatchewan, [2008] 2 S.C.R. 551, 2008 SCC 42 (majority)
 New Brunswick (Human Rights Commission) v Potash Corporation of Saskatchewan Inc, [2008] 2 S.C.R. 604, 2008 SCC 45 (concurrence)
 Redeemer Foundation v Canada (National Revenue), [2008] 2 S.C.R. 643, 2008 SCC 46 (majority)
 R v REM, [2008] 3 S.C.R. 3, 2008 SCC 51 (majority)
 R v HSB, [2008] 3 S.C.R. 32, 2008 SCC 52 (majority)
 RBC Dominion Securities Inc v Merrill Lynch Canada Inc, [2008] 3 S.C.R. 79, 2008 SCC 54 (majority)
 R v Dowe, [2008] 3 S.C.R. 109, 2008 SCC 55 (majority)
 R v Mahalingan, [2008] 3 S.C.R. 316, 2008 SCC 63 (majority)
 R v Caissey, [2008] 3 S.C.R. 451, 2008 SCC 65 (majority)

2009
 Ravndahl v Saskatchewan, 2009 SCC 7 (majority)
 Teck Cominco Metals Ltd v Lloyd's Underwriters, 2009 SCC 11 (majority)
 R v Craig, 2009 SCC 23, [2009] (concurrence)
 R v Ouellette, 2009 SCC 24 (dissent)
 AC v Manitoba (Director of Child and Family Services), 2009 SCC 30 (concurrence)
 R v Grant, 2009 SCC 32 (majority)
 R v Suberu, 2009 SCC 33 (majority)
 R v Harrison, 2009 SCC 34 (majority)
 R v Shepherd, 2009 SCC 35 (majority)
 Alberta v Hutterian Brethren of Wilson Colony, 2009 SCC 37 (majority)
 Grant v Torstar Corp, 2009 SCC 61 (majority)
 Quan v Cusson, 2009 SCC 62 (majority)

2010
{| width=100%
|-
|
{| width=100% align=center cellpadding=0 cellspacing=0
|-
! bgcolor=#CCCCCC | Statistics
|-
|

2011
{| width=100%
|-
|
{| width=100% align=center cellpadding=0 cellspacing=0
|-
! bgcolor=#CCCCCC | Statistics
|-
|

2012

{| width=100%
|-
|
{| width=100% align=center cellpadding=0 cellspacing=0
|-
! bgcolor=#CCCCCC | Statistics
|-
|

2013

{| width=100%
|-
|
{| width=100% align=center cellpadding=0 cellspacing=0
|-
! bgcolor=#CCCCCC | Statistics
|-
|

2014

{| width=100%
|-
|
{| width=100% align=center cellpadding=0 cellspacing=0
|-
! bgcolor=#CCCCCC | 2014 statistics
|-
|

2015

{| width=100%
|-
|
{| width=100% align=center cellpadding=0 cellspacing=0
|-
! bgcolor=#CCCCCC | Statistics
|-
|

2016

{| width=100%
|-
|
{| width=100% align=center cellpadding=0 cellspacing=0
|-
! bgcolor=#CCCCCC | 2016 statistics
|-
|

2017
{| width=100%
|-
|
{| width=100% align=center cellpadding=0 cellspacing=0
|-
! bgcolor=#CCCCCC | 2017 statistics
|-
|

McLachlin